Robin Harmony (born October 20, 1961) is an American college basketball coach. She currently serves as head coach of the College of Charleston Cougars women's basketball team. She previously was head coach at Lamar and St. Thomas University. Prior to that, she served as assistant coach (six years) and associate head coach (twelve years) at Miami Hurricanes. She split her stay at the University of Miami by serving as an assistant coach at Fairleigh Dickinson University for one season prior to her return to the Hurricanes.

Playing career
Harmony was a three-year letter winner at Hershey High School located in Hershey, Pennsylvania.  At the University of Miami, she earned a letter all four years playing for the Miami Hurricanes.  At Miami, Harmony recorded total of 1,308 points, 750 rebounds, 415 assists and 314 steals in four seasons. As of April, 2013, she still held the Miami single-game record for assists with 14 and was 10th on Miami's all-time scoring chart and fifth in rebounding.  After graduation, she continued playing basketball for the Avon Cosmetics women's team in Northampton, England.  She was named Most Valuable Player for the team in her one season there.  Harmony also had coaching duties with the team.

Harmony received several honors as a player.  Inducted in the Class of 1997, she was the first women's basketball player to be inducted into the University of Miami's Sports Hall of Fame.  In 2013, Harmony was named an Atlantic Coast Conference Women's Basketball Legend.

Coaching career

University of Miami
Harmony spent 18 years on the staff of the University of Miami.  She served as Assistant Coach for six years and Associate Head Coach for twelve years.  While Coach Harmony was at Miami, the Hurricanes won three Big East regular season championships and two Big East conference tournament championships.  The Hurricanes also participated in post season play seven time advancing to the sweet 16 one time.

St. Thomas University
Harmony became the first women's basketball coach of NAIA St. Thomas University in 2005.  While at St. Thomas, her teams compiled an overall record of 131–48, won three regular season championships, and one Sun Conference tournament championship.  Her teams participated in the NAIA National Tournament three times.

Lamar University
Harmony was named Lamar women's basketball head coach on April 30, 2013. The Lady Cardinals compiled an overall record of 18–13 and conference record of 13–5 in Coach Harmony's first year at Lamar. Her team was Southland Conference co-champion in the regular season. The Lady Cardinals participated in the WNIT, the fourth post season tournament for the Lady Cardinals in a five-year period. Her 2017–18 and 2018–19 teams won the Southland Conference regular season championship with a 17–1 record each season. The teams competed in the WNIT both years following losses in the Southland Conference women's basketball tournament.

On April 28, 2015, it was announced that Harmony had signed a three-year contract extension as Lamar's head coach.

Coach Harmony resigned her position on April 19, 2019 to become head women's basketball coach for the College of Charleston.

Head coaching record

References

1961 births
Living people
American women's basketball coaches
Basketball coaches from Pennsylvania
Basketball players from Pennsylvania
College of Charleston Cougars women's basketball coaches
Lamar Lady Cardinals basketball coaches
Miami Hurricanes women's basketball coaches
Miami Hurricanes women's basketball players
People from Hershey, Pennsylvania